Goniobranchus obsoletus is a species of colourful sea slug, a dorid nudibranch, a marine gastropod mollusc in the family Chromodorididae.

Distribution
This species was described from the Red Sea. It has also been reported from the Persian Gulf.

Description
Goniobranchus obsoletus is a chromodorid nudibranch with a mostly white mantle and an orange mantle edge. There is an irregular band of blue-black just inside the orange margin and the mantle is rugose with an orange-brown reticulation between the raised pustules. The rhinophores and gills are translucent brown with white markings.

References

Chromodorididae
Gastropods described in 1831